Incledon is a surname. Notable people with the surname include,

 Benjamin Incledon  (1730–1796), English antiquarian 
 Charles Incledon (1763–1826, English singer 
 Marjorie Incledon (1891–1973), English artist
 Robert Incledon (1676–1758), English lawyer and Mayor of Barnstaple